Robert Ovadia is an Australian journalist.

Ovadia is currently a reporter and fill-in presenter for Seven News in Sydney.

Career
Ovadia studied Communications and French at Macquarie University, and began his career in regional television in Wagga Wagga. Eighteen months later, he took a senior reporting job in Melbourne with Network Ten. In 1999, he took a job with Associated Press in London, while he toured Europe and parts of Asia. Ovadia joined Seven News in 2000, just after the 2000 Olympic Games.

While working with Seven, Ovadia has reported on a range of stories, including the 2002 Sydney bushfire crisis and the Iraq War, before being promoted to Crime Reporter in September 2003.

Ovadia has broken many major stories of statewide and national significance. In 2008, he and colleague Aela Callan won a prestigious Walkley Award for Television News Reporting for breaking the Iguanagate scandal that engulfed the NSW and federal governments.

In 2009, he was the MC at the funeral of the Lin family who were murdered outside their North Epping home in 2009. He was chosen ahead of Nine reporter Jessica Rich. The event was held at Sydney Olympic Park, New South Wales.

From 2011, Ovadia has filled in as a news anchor on various news bulletins, including Seven Morning News and The Morning Show as well as late night news updates. Ovadia is credited as Sydney's crime reporter, and fills predominantly crime and justice related stories. In late 2013, Ovadia won his second Walkley Award for his exposé into an Australian Defence Force sex scandal cover-up.

On 13 December 2013, Ovadia filled in on Today Tonight while regular fill-in presenter Kylie Gillies was on holidays. On Christmas Day 2013, 2014 and 2015, Ovadia presented the Seven News weeknight bulletin in Sydney.

In October 2019 Ovadia reported having his name circulated and receiving death threats after escorting pro-Beijing actress Celine Ma to safety from a mob of protesters. Ovadia criticized what he saw as weaponization of disinformation from Apple Daily, which selectively edited footage of Ma's assault as Ma attempting to instigate violence.

References 

Australian television journalists
Living people
Crime journalists
Australian Sephardi Jews
People educated at The Hills Grammar School
Year of birth missing (living people)